Ashley Voth (born 24 September 1988) is a Canadian retired female volleyball player. She was part of the Canada women's national volleyball team.

She participated in the 2010 FIVB Volleyball Women's World Championship. She played with University of Manitoba.

Clubs
 University of Manitoba (2010)

References

1988 births
Living people
Canadian women's volleyball players
Place of birth missing (living people)
University of Manitoba alumni